Luis de la Cerda, 1st Marquis of Cogolludo (in full) (c. 1506–1536) was a Spanish nobleman.

He was the eldest son of Don Juan de la Cerda, 2nd Duke of Medinaceli, by first wife Mencía Manuel de Portugal. He married Ana de Mendoza, Lady of the Nueve Lugares de la Cuadrilla de Sierra-Alta del Ducado de Medinaceli, without issue.

Sources

1506 births
1536 deaths
Luis 01
Luis 01